Abardeh or Abar Deh may refer to:
 Abardeh-ye Olya
 Abardeh-ye Sofla